The Fuxing Suspension Bridge is a suspension bridge connecting Dongshi District and Xinshe District in Taichung, Taiwan.

History
The bridge was opened in 2013.

Technical specifications
The bridge spans over a length of 150 meters over Dajia River.

See also
 List of bridges in Taiwan

References

2013 establishments in Taiwan
Bridges completed in 2013
Buildings and structures in Taichung
Suspension bridges in Taiwan
Tourist attractions in Taichung